KF Shkumbini is an Albanian football club based in the city of Peqin. The club's home ground is the Shkumbini Stadium and they compete in the Kategoria e Dytë.

History
Football was first introduced to the city of Peqin in the early 1920s after an army officer from Shkodër brought along a ball with him. An amateur club was formed in 1924 by Adem Bedali and other local men who had begun playing football. In the club's infancy they played friendly games with teams from other cities in Albania, before the creation of the Albanian Football Association in 1930 who organised the first official football competitions in the country. Shkumbini's first trophy came in 1936 when they defeated Apolonia Fier to win the Kategoria e Dytë. They remained in the lower divisions until 1994, when they finished 2nd in the Kategoria e Parë and achieved promotion to the Kategoria Superiore for the first time in the club's history. In their debut season in the top flight they finished in a respectable 7th place out of 16 teams, with a record of 11 wins, 8 draws and 11 losses. The club finished in 4th place in the 1997–98 season in the Kategoria Superiore, and striker Dorian Bubeqi was the league's top goalscorer with 26 goals.

Current squad

Technical staff

Historical list of coaches

 Shamil Dylgjeri (1993-1994)
 Edmond Bedalli (1994-1995)
 Shyqyri Rreli (1995)
 Vasil Bici (1996-1998)
 Agustin Kola (1998)
 Luan Deliu (1999)
 Ramadan Shehu (1999-2000)
 Artin Kovaçi (2000)
 Stavri Nica (2001)
 Luan Deliu (2001)
 Ramadan Shehu (2001-2002)
 Astrit Sejdini (2002)
 Eduard Abazi (2002-2003)
 Vasil Bici (2003)
 Agim Canaj (Jul 2004 - 16 Jan 2005)
 Faruk Sejdini (16 Jan 2005 – 24 Sep 2005)
 Alfred Ferko (24 Sep 2005 – 3 Nov 2005)
 Sulejman Demollari (3 Nov 2005 – 22 Jan 2006)
 Faruk Sejdini (22 Jan 2006 – Jun 2006)
 Vasil Bici (Jul 2006 - 31 Oct 2006)
 Faruk Sejdini (31 Oct 2006 – Jun 2007)
 Gugash Magani (Jul 2007 – 16 May 2009)
 Sokol Branica (16 May 2009 – Jun 2009)
 Gugash Magani (Jul 2009 – 30 Sep 2009)
 Kristaq Mile (30 Sep 2009 – 19 Dec 2009)
 Përparim Daiu (19 Dec 2009 – June 2010)
 Mirel Josa (June 2010 – 1 Sep 2010)
 Agim Canaj (1 Sep 2010 – 3 Dec 2010)
 Përparim Daiu (3 Dec 2010 – 13 Mar 2011)
 Kristaq Mile (13 Mar 2011 – June 2012)
 Gugash Magani (July 2012 – 12 Nov 2012)
 Kristaq Mile (12 Nov 2012 – May 2013)
 Sokol Branica (Aug 2013 – May 2014)
 Ilirjan File (Mar 2015 – Oct 2015)
 Kristaq Mile (Oct 2015 – May 2016)
 Sokol Branica (Aug 2016 – Mar 2018)
 Artan Bano (Mar 2018 – May 2019)
 Sokol Branica (Aug 2019 – Jan 2020)
 Lorenc Pasha (Jan 2020 – Aug 2021)
 Artan Bano (Aug 2021 – Aug 2021)
 Lorenc Pasha (Aug 2021 –Dec 2021)
 Love Kestelot (Jan 2022 –)

References

External links
KS Shkumbini Peqin
KS Shkumbini at UEFA.COM

Football clubs in Albania
1924 establishments in Albania
Peqin
Association football clubs established in 1924
Kategoria e Dytë clubs